The Church of Jesus Christ of Latter-day Saints in Venezuela refers to the Church of Jesus Christ of Latter-day Saints (LDS Church) and its members in Venezuela. The first small branch was established in 1966. Since then, the LDS Church in Venezuela has grown to more than 168,000 members in 228 congregations.

History

The first congregation was organized in November 1966, by Marion G. Romney.

On March 17, 2014, the LDS Church announced it would be removing the 152 missionaries in Venezuela and sending them to other missions in South America, the church announced Monday, due to political unrest. In February and March, riot police have clashed with anti-government demonstrators, with more than two dozen people killed.

Missions

Temples

See also

Religion in Venezuela

References

External links
 Newsroom - Venezuela
 The Church of Jesus Christ of Latter-day Saints (Venezuela) - Official site
 ComeUntoChrist.org Latter-day Saints Visitor site